L'Air du Temps is a women's perfume by the French fashion house Nina Ricci. It was created in 1948 by the French perfumer Francis Fabron, in collaboration with Nina Ricci's son Robert (1905–1988), who sought to expand the house's business into an in-house perfumery. In its original production, the perfume was contained in a bottle designed by René Lalique. This perfume is considered as one of the best-selling perfumes at that time.

In the 1991 movie The Silence of the Lambs, Hannibal Lecter identifies L'Air du Temps as a perfume sometimes worn by Clarice Starling.

References

Perfumes
Products introduced in 1948
20th-century perfumes
Designer perfumes